Long Siding is an unincorporated community in Mille Lacs County, in the U.S. state of Minnesota.

History
A post office called Long Siding was established in 1903, and remained in operation until 1954. The community was named for Edgar C. Long, a businessperson in the lumber industry.

References

Unincorporated communities in Mille Lacs County, Minnesota
Unincorporated communities in Minnesota